Glen Murakami is an American animator, director and producer best known for his work on Batman Beyond, Teen Titans, Teen Titans Go!, Ben 10: Alien Force and Ben 10: Ultimate Alien. Murakami co-created, produced, and developed the 2003 TV series Teen Titans.

Animation
Murakami originally wanted to be a comic book artist.  His friend from junior high and high school, Keith Weesner, got a job working on Batman: The Animated Series as a background artist and informed Murakami when they were hiring artists at Warner Bros. Animation.  Murakami was given a storyboard test, which he failed.  But seeing his drawing talent, he was hired anyway.

Working closely with Bruce Timm, Murakami worked as a character designer and storyboard artist from 1991 to 1993.  From 1995 to 1999, Murakami worked as Art Director on Superman: The Animated Series and The New Batman/Superman Adventures.

Batman Beyond
Murakami was promoted to producer for Batman Beyond and won an Emmy Award in 2001 for his work on the series.  In addition to producing, he also was credited for story on the movie, Batman Beyond: Return of the Joker.

Teen Titans
In 2002, according to Murakami in an interview in 2012, Sam Register, Senior Vice President of development at Cartoon Network at the time, wanted a show that was based on the comics, Teen Titans, and brought Murakami to help create the series based on the comics, the Teen Titans, being the series creator along with Sam Register and co-developer.  After a decade working on shows produced by his friend and mentor Bruce Timm, Murakami produced the Teen Titans without Timm, which was his first series without him. 

In addition to being series creator and producer, he was also character designer on the series. Murakami approached the show with an unusual design style, setting them apart from the rest of DC Comics animated programing. The show's style was dubbed Murakanime or "Americanime".

The popular series ran for five seasons, 65 episodes and concluded with the movie Teen Titans: Trouble in Tokyo in 2006.

Ben 10: Alien Force and Ben 10: Ultimate Alien
Following Teen Titans, Murakami teamed up with writer Dwayne McDuffie to revamp a series for Cartoon Network's Ben 10 franchise.  Murakami served as executive producer on Ben 10: Alien Force, which ran for three seasons and 46 episodes.

Immediately following Alien Force, Murakami and McDuffie revamped the follow-up series, Ben 10: Ultimate Alien.

Beware the Batman
In 2011, Warner Bros. Animation announced that Murakami would be executive producer on a computer-animated television series Beware the Batman.

Comics
Murakami illustrated the Star Wars comic Death Star Pirates - originally published in issues #16 through #20 of the Star Wars kids magazine in 1998 and later collected in Star Wars Tales Volume 2 by Dark Horse Comics.

He also drew a cover for Teen Titans Go!, and wrote and drew for stories in Batman Adventures and Batman: Mad Love and Other Stories, winning an Eisner Award for his work in the Batman Adventures Holiday Special.

Awards
Eisner Award - Best Single Issue - 1995 - 'Batman Adventures Holiday' Special (with Paul Dini, Bruce Timm, Ronnie del Carmen, and others)
Annie Award - Outstanding Individual Achievement for Production Design in an Animated Television Production - 1999 - Legends of the Dark Knight - 'The New Batman/Superman Adventures'/Outstanding Achievement in a Daytime Animated Television Production - 2001 - 'Batman Beyond' (with Jean MacCurdy, Alan Burnett, Paul Dini, and others)
Emmy Award - Outstanding Special Class Animated Program - 2001 - 'Batman Beyond' (with Jean MacCurdy, Alan Burnett, Paul Dini, Bruce Timm, Hilary Bader, Stan Berkowitz, Rich Fogel, Robert Goodman, Curt Geda, Butch Lukic, Dan Riba, James Tucker, Andrea Romano)

Influences
Murakami's influences include Jack Kirby, Alex Toth, John Byrne, Gilbert Hernandez, Jaime Hernandez, and Dave Stevens.

Filmography

Writing

References

External links 
 
 Official website

Place of birth missing (living people)
American people of Japanese descent
Living people
American television producers
American film producers
American art directors
Prop designers
American storyboard artists
American film directors
Year of birth missing (living people)